Anakpa is a village in Uruan local government area of Akwa Ibom State, Nigeria. The Ibibio people are occupants of the Anakpa village.

References 

Villages in Akwa Ibom